Jungle Suite is an album by Brazilian guitarist Bola Sete, released in 1985 through Dancing Cat Records. Recorded in 1982, it is the only known recording of Sete playing a steel-string acoustic guitar. Jungle Suite was his final album before his death from lung cancer in 1987.

Release and reception 

AllMusic critic Thom Jurek noted that Sete's "fusion of Brazilian, classical, flamenco, jazz, and numerous folk styles was unprecedented and remains unmatched." He declared the sessions "among the most inspired examples of passionate and technically brilliant guitar playing in the recorded history of the instrument."

Track listing

Release history

Personnel 
Bola Sete – steel-string acoustic guitar
George Winston – production

References

External links 
 

1985 albums
Bola Sete albums